Carmel is a small community in rural Saskatchewan, 18 km (11 miles) west of Humboldt and 101 km (62 miles) east of the City of Saskatoon. Carmel is within the Rural Municipality of Humboldt.

Mount Carmel Shrine
The Carmel area is home to the Shrine of Our Lady of Mount Carmel. This Roman Catholic landmark, located 4.5 km (2.7 miles) north of Carmel, was built by Antonio Molaro in 1928 (the statue foundation) and in 1937 (the chapel) on one of the highest points in east central Saskatchewan. The work was commissioned by Abbot Serverin Gertkin of St. Peter's Abbey in Muenster. The white marble statue imported from Italy is eight feet high and the foundation is 14 feet high. It was blessed in 1928. An annual pilgrimage has been held on the site since 1922

References

External links
 Photos of the church in Carmel

Humboldt No. 370, Saskatchewan
Unincorporated communities in Saskatchewan
Division No. 15, Saskatchewan